Rein Jan Hoekstra (born 1941) was born in Dokkum. He graduated from the University of Groningen in 1965, majoring in Law. He has since worked as an attorney (1965–1970), Chief of Staff to Prime Minister Ruud Lubbers in 1983, and Secretary General at the Ministry of General Affairs (1986–1994). In 1994, he became a member of the Raad van State is highest administrative court in the Netherlands.

In 2003 he was an informateur for the Crown along with Frits Korthals Altes of the People's Party for Freedom and Democracy (VVD), helping to form the second Balkenende cabinet. On 25 November 2006 he was again appointed by the Queen as informateur, during the 2006-2007 Dutch cabinet formation after the parliamentary elections of 2006, helping to form the fourth Balkenende cabinet.

Rein Jan Hoekstra is a member of the Christian Democratic Appeal (CDA). He is married and has one daughter.

References

External links
Consensus Politics 2003
City of The Hague

1941 births
Living people
Anti-Revolutionary Party politicians
Christian Democratic Appeal politicians
Dutch civil servants
20th-century Dutch lawyers
Members of the Council of State (Netherlands)
People from Dokkum
University of Groningen alumni